"I'm Upset" is a song by Canadian rapper Drake from his fifth studio album Scorpion (2018). It was released by Young Money Entertainment and Cash Money Records as the third single from the album on May 26, 2018. The song was written by Drake alongside producer Oogie Mane of Working on Dying.

Composition
"I'm Upset" is a hip hop song that features a trap production and "rolling hi-hats, deep bass and a subdued piano loop", with Drake rapping lines such as "I'm upset/50,000 on my head, it's disrespect". Drake also references needing to pay a woman's bills every month and "get her what she want". The song was also noted as containing an emo influence.

Critical reception
"I'm Upset" has garnered negative reviews from music critics. Jayson Greene wrote for Pitchfork, "But above all it is boring. Drake doesn't switch up his flow, the minimal beat drones on, and we are asked to take a rap song with the chanted chorus 'I'm upset' with a straight face. 'I'm upset' is not self-expression; it is what you teach a toddler to howl instead of pulling someone's hair."

Music video
The music video was directed by Karena Evans, and it features Drake reuniting with former cast members of Degrassi: The Next Generation, the Canadian teen drama series on which he portrayed the character Jimmy Brooks from 2001 to 2008.

The video features appearances by Degrassi cast members Stefan Brogren, Lauren Collins, Nina Dobrev, Jake Epstein, Stacey Farber, Shane Kippel, A.J. Saudin, Cassie Steele, Melissa McIntyre, Adamo Ruggiero, Christina Schmidt, Miriam McDonald, Sarah Barrable-Tishauer, Jake Goldsbie, Andrea Lewis, Marc Donato, Dalmar Abuzeid, Paula Brancati, Ephraim Ellis and Linlyn Lue, as well as cameo appearances from Kevin Smith and Jason Mewes reprising their Jay and Silent Bob characters from Smith's View Askewniverse film series.

Personnel
Credits adapted from Tidal.
 Noah "40" Shebib – recording engineering
 Noel Cadastre – recording engineering 
 Noel "Gadget" Campbell – mixing
 Greg Moffet – assistant mixing
 Ronald Moonoo – assistant mixing
 Harley Arsenault – assistant mixing
 Oogie Mane – production

Charts

Weekly charts

Year-end charts

Certifications

References

External links

2018 songs
2018 singles
Drake (musician) songs
Songs written by Drake (musician)
Cash Money Records singles
Young Money Entertainment singles
Degrassi: The Next Generation